Uva is a rural locality (a settlement) and the administrative center of Uvinsky District, Udmurtia, Russia. Population:

References

Notes

Sources

Rural localities in Udmurtia